Shooting sports at the 2002 Asian Games was held in Changwon International Shooting Range, Changwon, South Korea between 2 and 8 October 2002.

Schedule

Medalists

Men

Women

Medal table

Participating nations
A total of 407 athletes from 34 nations competed in shooting at the 2002 Asian Games:

References

2002 Asian Games Report, Pages 596–685

External links
Official website

 
2002 Asian Games events
2002
Asian Games
2002 Asian Games